Darnell Terrell (born May 30, 1984, in St. Louis, Missouri) is a professional American and Canadian football cornerback who is currently a free agent. He was signed as an undrafted free agent by the Cleveland Browns in 2008. He played college football for the Missouri Tigers.  He has also been a member of the RiverCity Rage and Edmonton Eskimos.

Professional career

Cleveland Browns
Terrell was not selected in the 2008 NFL Draft, and was signed by the Cleveland Browns on April 30, 2008, as an undrafted free agent but was released on June 17, 2008.

Edmonton Eskimos
Terrell was signed by the Edmonton Eskimos on April 23, 2009. He was released on June 6, 2009.

La Crosse Spartans
Set the La Crosse Spartans interception record at 7 in 2010, and was voted First-team All-IFL by the league.

Nebraska Danger
Terrell played for the Nebraska Danger of the Indoor Football League from 2011 to 2015.

References

External links
Missouri Tigers bio 
River City Rage bio 
Nebraska Danger bio

1984 births
Living people
Players of American football from St. Louis
Players of Canadian football from St. Louis
American football cornerbacks
Canadian football defensive backs
American players of Canadian football
Coffeyville Red Ravens football players
Missouri Tigers football players
Cleveland Browns players
RiverCity Rage players
Edmonton Elks players
Omaha Beef players
La Crosse Spartans players
Nebraska Danger players